Smart pipe, related to a mobile network operator (MNO or operator), refers to an operator’s network which leverages existing or unique service abilities, and the operator’s customer relationships, to provide value beyond that of data connectivity only. The use of the term “smart” refers to the operator’s ability to add value for added, and often unique, types of services and content beyond bandwidth and network speed only.

Among the commonly understood operational models for a MNO are smart pipes, walled gardens, and dumb pipes.

Examples 
While there is no real industry standard definition of a smart pipe, there are several operators, bloggers, and researchers who have described aspects of a smart pipe which are generally accepted.

Network operator 3 led the way with the release of its X-Series line of devices in 2006. The X-Series platform bundles a set of services, several of which are unique to 3, and provides unlimited data access in exchange for a fixed monthly premium. While not necessarily a full realization of a smart pipe, 3 is one of the first operators to offer such a combination of bandwidth and value-added services for flat-rate pricing.

In addition to pricing, there is a set of services commonly viewed as parts of a smart pipe, such as: 
 Location-based services
 Presence information
 Customer analytics
 Computing platforms, mobile or application
 Mobile operating systems
 User interfaces
 Personalization
 Application programming interfaces (APIs), for devices or networks
 Payment, Billing
 Directory assistance, directory services
 Quality of service

By exposing these types of services to the mobile ecosystem, network operators can maintain the value of their pipes while enabling entrepreneurs to create new business models and generate entirely new revenue streams.

The need for operators to innovate around a smart pipe is rising as they face rising pressure from media companies and new technologies, such as Apple’s iPhone, Nokia’s consumer portal Ovi, and even the open-access policies of the U.S. Federal Communications Commission (FCC) introduced around its upcoming 700 MHz spectrum auction.

Recently, Arun Sarin, CEO of Vodafone, was criticized for some statements he made about how Vodafone will always have a unique relationship with its subscribers through its billing relationship. Although Sarin’s point has been true traditionally, as the article points out there are several new threats to that exclusivity such as traditional credit card, Obopay, PayPal Mobile, and existing media companies like Google via the Android platform, Yahoo via Go, and Apple via iPhone.

See also 
 Mobile phone
 Mobile network operator
 Walled garden (technology)
 Dumb pipe

References 

Mobile technology